Georgina Emma Mary Born,   is a British academic, anthropologist, musicologist and musician. As a musician she is known as Georgie Born and for her work in Henry Cow and with Lindsay Cooper.

Background
Born was born in Wheatley, Oxfordshire, the granddaughter of the physicist and Nobel laureate Max Born, daughter of the pharmacologist Gustav Born and Ann Plowden-Wardlaw, stepdaughter of American theatre director and writer George Mully, and cousin of the pop singer Olivia Newton-John. She is the partner of social theorist and political geographer Andrew Barry.

Music
Born studied the cello and piano at the Royal College of Music in London, and performed classical and modern music including stints with the Michael Nyman Band, the Penguin Cafe Orchestra and the Flying Lizards. She also studied for a year at the Chelsea School of Art.

In June 1976, she joined the English avant-rock group Henry Cow as bass guitarist and cellist, following the departure of John Greaves. Henry Cow was in a period of intensive touring and Born toured Europe with the group for two years.

After Henry Cow, Born performed and recorded with a number of groups and musicians, including fellow Henry Cow member Lindsay Cooper, National Health, Bruford, and Mike Westbrook, particularly as a cellist in the Westbrook Orchestra. Her playing is prominent on Westbrook's album, The Cortege. Late in 1977, Born, Cooper, Sally Potter and Maggie Nichols founded the Feminist Improvising Group. She also recorded with The Raincoats, and played improvised music with Lol Coxhill, Steve Beresford, David Toop and others as a member of the London Musicians' Collective.

During the 1980s, Born was an occasional member of Derek Bailey's Company, and played cello and bass guitar on numerous soundtracks for television and film for composers Lindsay Cooper and Mike Westbrook, as well as the soundtrack for the Stephen Poliakoff play Caught on a Train (1980). She had a walk-on part in Sally Potter's film The Gold Diggers (1983).

Academia

Born studied anthropology at University College London, gaining her BSc in 1982 and her PhD (supervised by Michael Gilsenan and Michael Rowlands) in 1989. Her first academic job (1986–89) was in the Department of Human Sciences at Brunel University, where she assisted Roger Silverstone in setting up the degree in Communication and Information Studies. Born moved to a lectureship in the Department of Media and Communications at Goldsmiths' College, London (1989–97), where she worked alongside Dick Hebdige.

Cambridge

In 1997 Born began work for an Assistant Lectureship in the Faculty of Social and Political Sciences at the University of Cambridge. In 2000 she was appointed to a Lectureship, in 2003 to Reader in Sociology, Anthropology and Music, and in 2006 to Professor of Sociology, Anthropology and Music at Cambridge, a title that recognises her interdisciplinary contributions.

At Cambridge, Born teaches the sociology and anthropology of culture, media, music, and ethnographic method in the Department of Sociology. She is responsible for the only dedicated lecture course on contemporary media in the social sciences.

Born is a member of Cambridge's Screen Media Group, which in 2006 launched Cambridge's first cross-Schools master's degree, Screen Media and Cultures. Born founded and directs the Cambridge Media Research Group which runs a seminar series and related events. In 2005 she organised a conference at Cambridge on the legacy of Laura Mulvey's essay, "Visual Pleasure and Narrative Cinema".

Between 1996 and 1998, Born was a visiting professor in the Institute of Musicology at the University of Aarhus, and from 1997 to 1998 Senior Research Fellow at King's College, Cambridge. From 1998 to 2006 she was Fellow and Director of Studies in Social and Political Sciences at Emmanuel College, Cambridge.

Born is Honorary Professor of Anthropology at University College London and a Fellow of the Center for Cultural Sociology at Yale University. She is also a Fellow of the Australian Cultural Sociology Association and of the Australian Centre for Independent Journalism.

Oxford
In 2010 Born was awarded an Advanced Grant by the European Research Council for a major programme of research on the transformation of music by digital media. Subsequently, she moved to become Professor of Music and Anthropology at the University of Oxford. Since 2012, she has also been a Fellow of Mansfield College, Oxford. In 2014 she was elected a Fellow of the British Academy, the United Kingdom's national academy for the humanities and social sciences.

Notable academic achievements

Born uses ethnography to study cultural production, particularly music, television and information technologies, and is a leading exponent both of institutional ethnography and of anthropology's application to the critical study of Western modernity. In relation to music, television and IT her work has ranged from studies of cultural production and cultural politics, to intellectual property, authorship and subjectivity, to materiality, technology and mediation. She is an international authority on computer music and musical modernism in the twentieth century, and also on contemporary media policy, the BBC and public service broadcasting in the United Kingdom and Europe.

Born's earlier research involved anthropological and sociological studies of art and popular musics. Her first book, Rationalising Culture: IRCAM, Boulez, and the Institutionalisation of the Musical Avant-Garde, combined ethnography with cultural history in an analysis of the crisis in twentieth-century art music through the example of IRCAM, the computer music research institute founded by Pierre Boulez. The book (edited with David Hesmondhalgh) Western Music and Its Others: Difference, Representation and Appropriation in Music (2000) integrates approaches from musicology, anthropology and post-colonial theory to address how music can be employed to represent social identities and cultural differences, and the techniques whereby both art and popular musics appropriate other musics.

Born's second ethnography, Uncertain Vision: Birt, Dyke and the Reinvention of the BBC (Secker and Warburg, 2004; Vintage, 2005), analyses the transformation of the BBC in the preceding decade. It describes the effects on the corporation of Director General John Birt's implementation of the ‘new public management’: marketisation and market research, audit and accountability procedures – all intended to boost efficiency and increase the BBC's democratic functioning by effecting greater responsiveness to its audiences. The study therefore represents one of the most detailed accounts of the impact of commercial management techniques on Britain's public sector. Derived from fieldwork in the mid-1990s and the early 2000s mainly conducted within the corporation's Drama, Documentary, News and Current Affairs departments, the book adds substance to claims that the BBC has moved towards a market orientation to the detriment of its public service remit. Born argues that this resulted from a combination of the imposition of neo-liberal policies and wider changes in the British and international broadcasting ecology.

In 2001–02 Born made a study of the digital strategies of the BBC and Channel Four, Britain's main public service broadcasters, which showed that Channel Four was being driven primarily by commercialism and had drifted seriously from its public service remit for innovation and diversity. She has subsequently written both policy interventions and normative essays on the changing nature of public service broadcasting with the advent of digital media. Born was invited in 2005 to give written and oral evidence to the House of Lords Select Committee on BBC Charter Review, and has lectured to public service broadcasters in Europe and Australia as well as to broadcasting and journalist trade unions in Britain and Europe.

Between 2004 and 2006 Born was involved in research (with Marilyn Strathern and Andrew Barry) on interdisciplinarity in knowledge and cultural production, in which she carried out case studies of the use of ethnography by the IT industry, and on art-science and new media art. Born has developed an interdisciplinary approach – using anthropology, sociology, musicology and the arts – to theorising cultural and media production that builds on and extends the work of Pierre Bourdieu, one that integrates aesthetics and history with social scientific perspectives. She has published a number of papers in scientific journals, including Social Anthropology, Cultural Anthropology, American Anthropologist, Journal of Material Culture, Screen, Cultural Values, Javnost, The Political Quarterly, Media, Culture and Society, New Formations and Twentieth Century Music. She is on the editorial boards of Anthropological Theory, Cultural Sociology and New Media and Society, and has been on the editorial boards of Popular Music, Free Associations and Journal of the Royal Musical Society.

In 2010 Born and Ben Walton (a University lecturer in the faculty of music at Cambridge) piloted a Mellon-funded interdisciplinary graduate seminar series on 'Music and Society' at Cambridge University's Centre for Research on Arts, Social Sciences and Humanities. This series was open to both graduates in sociology and graduates in musicology and attempted to provide interdisciplinary discussion covering 'a range of subjects that explore music's place and functions within diverse social environments'.

Born was appointed Officer of the Order of the British Empire (OBE) in the 2016 Birthday Honours for services to musicology, anthropology, and higher education.

Bibliography

Born, Georgina; Barry, Andrew (2013). Interdisciplinarity: Reconfigurations of the Social and Natural Sciences. Routledge. 
Born, Georgina (2013). Music, Sound and Space: Transformations of Public and Private Experience. Cambridge University Press.
Born, Georgina; Lewis, Eric; Straw, Will (2017). Improvisation and Social Aesthetics. Duke University Press.
Born, Georgina (editor) (2022). Music and Digital Media: A planetary anthropology. UCL Press.

Discography
With Art Bears
Hopes and Fears (1978)
With National Health
Of Queues and Cures (1978)
With Henry Cow
Western Culture (1979)
The 40th Anniversary Henry Cow Box Set (2009, 9xCD+DVD, Recommended Records, UK)
The Henry Cow Box Redux: The Complete Henry Cow (2019, 17xCD+DVD, Recommended Records, UK)
With Feminist Improvising Group
Feminist Improvising Group (1979, Cassette, UK)
With Bruford
Gradually Going Tornado (1980)
With Stormy Six
Macchina Maccheronica (1980)
With Mike Westbrook
Bright as Fire (1980)
The Cortege (1982)
On Duke's Birthday (HatART, 1985)
With Lindsay Cooper
Rags (1981)
The Golddiggers – original soundtrack to the film The Gold Diggers by Sally Potter (1983)
Music for Other Occasions (1986)
With The Raincoats
Odyshape (1981)
With Peter Blegvad
The Naked Shakespeare (1983)
With News from Babel
Work Resumed on the Tower (1984)
With The Orckestra
"Unreleased Orckestra Extract" (3" CD single, 2006, Recommended Records, UK)

References

External links
Profile at University of Cambridge
Faculty Fellows – Georgina Born. The Center for Cultural Sociology
Mediating Cultural Politics: A Dialogue with Georgina Born. Conversations in Culture and the Media

Living people
Academics of Goldsmiths, University of London
Alumni of the Royal College of Music
Alumni of University College London
Canterbury scene
English anthropologists
British women anthropologists
English cellists
English rock bass guitarists
Progressive rock bass guitarists
English people of German-Jewish descent
Women cellists
Women bass guitarists
Fellows of Emmanuel College, Cambridge
Henry Cow members
Feminist musicians
Sociomusicologists
Fellows of the British Academy
Officers of the Order of the British Empire
National Health members
Year of birth missing (living people)
The Orckestra members
Jewish anthropologists
Family of Max Born